Vivekananda Institute for Leadership Development  or V-Lead is an international research and training organisation under Swami Vivekananda Youth Movement, Saragur, India.

The Mission
Vivekananda Institute for Leadership Development (V-LEAD), an initiative of Swami Vivekananda Youth Movement  was established in 2002 with the mission of developing human and social capital for nation building under the training, research, advocacy and consultancy sector of SVYM. The TRAC activities of the organisation are  guided by Dr. Ramaswami Balasubramaniam, Founder SVYM, a Harvard scholar and a social activist based in India.

Academic Programmes Offered
 MDM Master in Development Management (Mysore University)

Training Programmes 
 Training to young on development issues
 Training to Non-profit organisations
 Training to government officers
 Training to corporates on Leadership/community led development.

Community Based Programmes
 Voters' Awareness Programmes.
 
 Mass Awareness programme
 Right to Information activism
 Citizen participation committees
 Rural interventions in village sanitation drives
 Capacity Building for Monitoring committees
 Gramavani village News Letter

Collaborations
Vivekananda Institute is collaborating with the following organisations for conducting various training programs:
   Administrative Training Institute, Mysore.
   University of Mysore.
   Azim Premji University, Bangalore 
   State Institute for Rural Development, Mysore.
   JSS Group of Institute, Karnataka.
   Asha for Education,
   Infosys Technologies, Mysore.
   British Council, India.

Visit of the U.S.Ambassador
The US Ambassador to India Mr. Richard Verma visited Vivekananda Institute on 1 April 2015. He interacted with the students of the Master in Development Management at Vivekananda Institute for Leadership Development (V-LEAD).

See also
 Hebbal, Mysore

References

External links

Universities and colleges in Mysore
Charities based in India